Svein Jacobsen is a Norwegian orienteering competitor. He is Relay World Champion from 1978, as a member of the Norwegian winning team. He also has a silver medal from 1976, and a bronze medal from 1974. He obtained bronze in the 1976 Individual World Championship.

References

Year of birth missing (living people)
Living people
Norwegian orienteers
Male orienteers
Foot orienteers
World Orienteering Championships medalists
20th-century Norwegian people